Leslie Mayfield (19 January 1926 – 2014) was an English professional footballer who played in the Football League for Mansfield Town.

References

1926 births
2014 deaths
English footballers
Association football defenders
English Football League players
Ashfield United F.C. players
Mansfield Town F.C. players
Gainsborough Trinity F.C. players